The Czechoslovak-American Marionette Theatre was launched in 1990 with the first solo performance by puppeteer, Vít Hořejš, at Jan Hus Church on East 74th Street in New York City, the old Czech neighborhood. A senior member of the audience remarked that a puppet theater had once existed at Jan Hus when she was a child, but she was not sure what had happened to the marionettes. Curiosity led Horejs to the church office, and an administrator showed him to the attic, where in an old chest there was a huge set of puppets, some possibly as much as 180 years old.  The company's first New York season, in 1990 showcased “Johannes Dokchtor Faust, a Petrifying Puppet Comedye” from a traditional Czechoslovakian puppet script. Since the debut of "Faust", many productions have been presented in New York City venues including La MaMa Experimental Theatre Club, and also, in the U.S., in venues more than 30 states.  The company has also performed around the world in Poland, the Czech Republic, Turkey and Pakistan.

Productions
The Twelfth Night 
Once There Was a Village
The Life and Times of Lee Harvey Oswald
Don Juan, or The Wages of Debauchery
The Prose of the Transsiberian and of the Little Joan of France
Johannes Dokchtor Faust
Rusalka, the Little Rivermaid
Golem 
The Very Sad Story of Ethel & Julius, Lovers and Spyes, and about Their Untymelie End while Sitting in a Small Room at the Correctional Facility in Ossining, N.Y.
The Bass Saxophone
Hamlet
The Historye of Queen Ester, King Ahasverus, and the Haughty Haman
Czech Tales with Strings
The White Doe, Or, The Piteous Trybulations of the Sufferyng Countess Jenovéfa
A Christmas Carol, OY! Hanukkah, Merry Kwanzaa
Snehurka, The Snow Maiden
Twelve Iron Sandals
Mr. M.
Revolution?!

References
BWW News Desk, Off-off Broadway World,Thursday, April 28, 2011,'Czechoslovak-American Marionette Theater's "Mr. M" moves to JCC in Manhattan May 5 to 8"

Anita Gates, The New York Times November 20, 2009 "Gender Switch in Illyria, With Players 8 Inches Tall"

Ian Willoughby, Radio PrahaJanuary 8, 2008 "The Czechoslovak-American Marionette Theatre"

Mattew Gurewitsch, The New York Times, November 4, 2007 "Shakespeare in the Round-and-Round"

 

Theatre companies in New York (state)